Horst Fügner (11 March 1923 – 22 November 2014) was a German former Grand Prix motorcycle road racer. He rode for the East German MZ works team from 1954 and rode in Grands Prix from 1957.

In 1955, 1956 and 1958 Fügner won the 250cc class of the East German motorcycling championship. His best year was 1958 when he won the Swedish Grand Prix and finished the season second to Tarquinio Provini in the 250cc World Championship.

References

1923 births
2014 deaths
German motorcycle racers
125cc World Championship riders
250cc World Championship riders
Isle of Man TT riders
Sportspeople from Chemnitz